Constance Aston Fowler was a 17th-century English manuscript author and anthologist. Born "Constance Aston" about 1621, she was the youngest child of Walter Aston, 1st Lord Aston of Forfar and Gertrude Sadleir, who were a Catholic family. Her home was The Priory at St Thomas, near the family home of Tixal Hall in Staffordshire.

Studied
Her Verse Miscellany of Constance Aston Fowler is studied as an example of "how manuscript texts were produced, disseminated, and preserved in provincial areas." "Constance Aston Fowler built up her own private anthology, mingling the poems of her family with ones by Ben Jonson, Henry King, and John Donne. Her father, her brother Herbert, sister-in-law Katherine Thimelby, sister Gertrude and their friend Lady Dorothy Shirley contributed. Four of the poems in the anthology also appear in Tixall Poetry and the manuscript, HM 904. She began the anthology in the 1630s and made the last entry in 1658. The manuscript now resides at the Huntington Library in San Marino, California (number HM 904).

Constance married Walter Fowler in about 1634–1635 and had 12 children; Walter, Edward, William, Bryan, Thomas, Francis, Constance, Dorothy, Gertrude, Constance, Mary, and Magdalen. Edward, Bryan, Francis and Constance all died young. Constance died on March 29, 1664 and is buried at Baswich, Staffordshire.

References

Primary sources

Secondary sources
 (Ph. D. dissertation)

1620s births
English women writers
Year of death unknown
Women anthologists
Daughters of barons